was a Japanese professional baseball pitcher of Zainichi Korean origin, one of the best-known pitchers in Japanese baseball history, and is the only Japanese pitcher to have won 400 games. He was inducted in the Japanese Baseball Hall of Fame in 1988.

Nicknamed "The Emperor" because he was the most dominant pitcher in Japan during his prime, Kaneda holds numerous Nippon Professional Baseball (NPB) career records. He won 400 games despite being on an extremely weak team, the Kokutetsu Swallows, for most of his career. About 90% of his 400 career wins came with the Swallows. Kaneda batted and threw left-handed.

Career
Kaneda was born, in Heiwa, Aichi Prefecture, to Korean parents. He quit high school in 1950, and joined the Kokutetsu Swallows (current Tokyo Yakult Swallows) in the middle of 1950. The Swallows were a very weak team at that point in Japanese baseball. Kaneda quickly became recognized as the best pitcher in Japan for his fastball and trademark drop curve. Kaneda also had terrible control during the first few years of his career, walking over 190 batters in 1951 and 1952. Although his control got better as his career progressed, he eventually established the all-time Japanese record for walks.

The speed gun was not introduced to Japan until after Kaneda had retired, but he claims that the velocity of his fastball reached 110 mph during his prime. In Kaneda's rookie year, player Masayasu Kaneda (no relation) from the Osaka Tigers complained that Kaneda's pitches appeared too fast because the mound was set too close to the batter's box. The game was stopped as the umpire measured the distance with a tape measure; the mound was found to be set the correct distance away from the batter's box. In later years, Noboru Aota admitted Kaneda's fastball was faster than Eiji Sawamura's one.

Despite the poor team surrounding him, Kaneda won 20 or more games for 14 straight seasons, including amassing 31 wins in 1958. However, despite marking an ERA under 2.00 for many of his seasons with the team, Kaneda still lost over at least 10 games a year in his first 15 professional seasons, including six seasons where he lost 20 or more games. (While Kaneda was on the team, the Swallows didn't finish with a .500 record until 1961, and even then only finished in third place in the Central League.)

He pitched a no-hitter against the Osaka Tigers in September 1951, and a perfect game against the Chunichi Dragons on August 21, 1957. This was the fourth perfect game in Japanese professional baseball history. In this game, he suffered from a stomach ache, and the Dragons took a long timeout to protest a call in the ninth with one out. After the timeout, he said to his teammates, "Only 6 strikes, so you guys get ready to go home.", and he went on to pitch a perfect game. In the 1958 season opener, Kaneda struck out Yomiuri Giants rookie Shigeo Nagashima in all four of his at bats. He did the same in 1959 against the Giants' Sadaharu Oh in Oh's first professional game.

Kaneda's massive workload and overuse of the curveball caused huge pain in his pitching arm during the last few years of his career; he eventually developed an underhanded changeup during his later years.

In 1965, Kaneda became a free agent and joined the Yomiuri Giants. Kaneda contributed to the teams' nine-year league championship streak, and retired in 1969, after marking his 400th win. His jersey number, 34, was retired by the Giants in 1970.

Notable NPB records Kaneda holds include: complete games (365), wins (400), losses (298), strikeouts (4490), innings pitched (5,526), and walks (1,808). With 82 career shutouts, he is only one behind Victor Starffin for most all-time in NPB. He also hit the most home runs of any Japanese pitcher (36), and is one of the few pitchers that played in over 1,000 games. He led the league in strikeouts 10 times, victories three times, and ERA three times, and won the Eiji Sawamura Award three times. He also held the NPB record for career ejections (eight times), before being passed by Tuffy Rhodes in 2005.

Post-retirement
Kaneda worked as a commentator before being called on to manage the Lotte Orions (currently known as the Chiba Lotte Marines) from 1973 to 1978, and again from 1990 to 1991. The Orions won the Japan Series championship in 1974, with Kaneda's younger brother, Tomehiro, pitching for the Orions and winning the MVP award. The Orions used uniforms designed by Kaneda for 19 seasons.

In 1978, Kaneda founded the Meikyukai, one of the two Japanese baseball halls of fame. The Meikyukai honors players born during the Shōwa period (1926–1988). Players are automatically inducted if they reach career totals of 2,000 hits, 200 wins, or 250 saves (added in December 2003) in the Japanese professional leagues.

Personal life
Kaneda parents were Koreans and his Korean name was Kim Kyung-Hong (金慶弘 김경홍). Kaneda was naturalized in Japan in 1959. His three younger brothers all played in the Japanese professional leagues.

Kaneda was married twice, and divorced once. He had three children. His son works as an actor, and his nephew Akihito Kaneishi also had considerable success as a professional baseball player.

In popular culture
Shotaro Kaneda, the protagonist of Mitsuteru Yokoyama's giant robot manga series Tetsujin 28-go, is named after Kaneda.

Career statistics
Played with the Kokutetsu Swallows from 1950 to 1964, Yomiuri Giants from 1965 to 1969.
 944 Games
 400 Wins
 298 Losses
 5,526 Innings pitched
 4,490 Strikeouts
 2.34 ERA

Managerial statistics
Managed the Lotte Orions from 1973 to 1978, and 1990–1991.
 1,011 Games
 471 Wins
 468 Losses
 72 Ties
 Japanese Championship Series Winner (1974)

References

1933 births
2019 deaths
Baseball people from Aichi Prefecture
Japanese people of Korean descent
Japanese baseball players
Yomiuri Giants players
Kokutetsu Swallows players
Managers of baseball teams in Japan
Chiba Lotte Marines managers
Naturalized citizens of Japan
Nippon Professional Baseball pitchers who have pitched a perfect game
Japanese Baseball Hall of Fame inductees